Tietje is a surname and given name. Notable people with the name include:

 Les Tietje (1910–1996), American baseball player
 Tietje Spannenburg-Pagels (1906–after 1933), Dutch kortebaan speed skater

See also